"Dear Lady Twist" is a song written and produced by Frank Guida, and performed by Gary U.S. Bonds.  It reached #5 on the U.S. R&B chart and #9 on the U.S. pop chart in 1962.  It was featured on his 1962 album Twist Up Calypso.

The song ranked #32 on Billboard magazine's Top 100 singles of 1962.

Background
This song begins with a brief spoken dialogue, as Gary US Bonds asks a lady to dance the Twist with him, in which she replies that she does not know how to do it, resulting in Gary to explain it, by singing. This song is also noted for the male backup singers, repeating the phrase: "Get up from your Chair".

Other versions
Rod McKuen released a version of the song on his 1961 album Mr. Oliver Twist.
Duane Eddy released a version of the song on his 1962 album Twistin' 'N' Twangin'.

Popular culture
This song's title and lyric line are referenced in the song "Mashed Potato Time" (1962) by Dee Dee Sharp.

References

1961 songs
1961 singles
Songs written by Frank Guida
Gary U.S. Bonds songs
Duane Eddy songs
Twist (dance)